Bo Kaliszan (born 28 November 1973) is a Danish rower. He competed in the men's double sculls event at the 2000 Summer Olympics.

References

1973 births
Living people
Danish male rowers
Olympic rowers of Denmark
Rowers at the 2000 Summer Olympics
Rowers from Copenhagen